The 2019 Bredene Koksijde Classic was the 17th edition of the Bredene Koksijde Classic road cycling one day race and the first edition of the rebranded Handzame Classic. It was held on 22 March 2019, starting and finishing in the titular towns of Bredene and Koksijde, respectively.

Teams 
Eight UCI WorldTeams, fourteen UCI Professional Continental teams, and one UCI Continental team made up the twenty-three teams that participated in the race. Of the 154 riders who entered the race, there were 137 finishers and two non-starters.

UCI WorldTeams

 
 
 
 
 
 
 
 

UCI Professional Continental Teams

 
 
 
 
 
 
 
 
 
 
 
 
 
 

UCI Continental Teams

Result

References

External links 
 

2019
Bredene Koksijde Classic
Bredene Koksijde Classic